Liu Anlong (born 11 March 1980) is a Chinese sport shooter.

He participated at the 2018 ISSF World Shooting Championships, winning a medal.

References

External links

Living people
1980 births
Chinese male sport shooters
Trap and double trap shooters
Sport shooters from Dalian
Asian Games medalists in shooting
Shooters at the 2006 Asian Games
Shooters at the 2018 Asian Games
Asian Games gold medalists for China
Medalists at the 2006 Asian Games
21st-century Chinese people